Brenda Gilhooly (born 1964 in Epsom, Surrey) is an English comedian. She studied English and Drama at the University College of Swansea, University of Wales and graduated in 1987. She is best known for Gayle Tuesday, an archetypal dumb blonde and Page 3 girl. She enjoyed brief success with this character appearing on various TV shows.

She first appeared on British television in 1991 with Channel 4 series Remote Control and then with !Viva Cabaret! in 1993, alongside similar character-based acts such as Lily Savage and Bob Downe. She has since appeared on shows such as the Jack Dee Show and Lily Live!, as well as her own series Gayle's World in 1996. She has also appeared on Lily Savage's Blankety Blank.

Most of her recent appearances have been as characters other than Gayle Tuesday, notably on Harry Hill's TV Burp on which she is a writer as well as an occasional performer. Gilhooly is married and has two daughters.

Gilhooly returned to television as Gayle Tuesday in 2010 with the Living series Gayle Tuesday: The Comeback.

In 2019 Gilhooly wrote a new sitcom for BBC Radio 4 Madam Mayor.  The first episode was aired on Friday 12 July 2019. Gilhooly starred as Madam Mayor and was supported by Jack Dee, Harry Hill, Michelle Collins and Elis James.

References

External links
 

1964 births
English women comedians
English comedy writers
English television presenters
Living people
People from Epsom